A canopy is an overhead roof or else a structure over which a fabric or metal covering is attached, able to provide shade or shelter from weather conditions such as sun, hail, snow and rain. A canopy can also be a tent, generally without a floor.
The word comes from the ancient Greek κωνώπειον (konópeion, "cover to keep insects off"), from κώνωψ (kónops, "cone-face"), which is a bahuvrihi compound meaning "mosquito". The first 'o' changing into 'a' may be due to influence from the place name Canopus, Egypt thought of as a place of luxuries.

Architectural canopies include projections giving protection from the weather, or merely decoration. Such canopies are supported by the building to which they are attached and often also by a ground mounting provided by not less than two stanchions, or upright support posts.

Canopies can also stand alone, such as a fabric covered gazebo or cabana. Fabric canopies can meet various design needs. Many modern fabrics are long-lasting, bright, easily cleaned, strong and flame-retardant. This material can be vinyl, acrylic, polyester or canvas. Modern frame materials offer high strength-to-weight ratios and corrosion resistance. The proper combination of these properties can result in safe, strong, economical and attractive products.

Classification numbers
Construction Specifications Institute (CSI) Division 10 MasterFormat 2004 Edition:

 10 73 16 - Canopies
 10 73 00 - Protective Covers

CSI MasterFormat 1995 Edition:

 10530 - Canopies

See also
 Awning
 Chuppah
 Dome
 Onion dome
 Pop up canopies

References

Roofs